Sant Joan les Fonts is a Benedictine monastery in Sant Joan les Fonts, Garrotxa comarca, Catalonia, Spain. 
In 1079, the church was owned by the viscounts of Besalu. They gave it to the abbey to abbey of St. Victor of Marseille, who founded a Benedictine priory. It was subordinate to Sant Pere de Besalú until 1592, and to Sant Pere de Camprodón until 1835. It was declared a national monument in 1981. Built in Romanesque style, it has three naves, the central one pointed vault and the naves at the side rounded. It was restored in the late 20th century.

Bibliography
 Pladev all, Antoni (1999). Guies Catalunya Romànica, La Garrotxa. Barcelona, Pòrtic.  (in Catalán).

Benedictine monasteries in Catalonia
Christian monasteries established in the 11th century
Romanesque architecture in Catalonia